The 1957 Rhode Island Rams football team was an American football team that represented the University of Rhode Island as a member of the Yankee Conference during the 1957 NCAA College Division football season. In its second season under head coach Herb Maack, the team compiled a 5–2–1 record (3–0–1 against conference opponents), tied with Connecticut for the Yankee Conference championship, and outscored opponents by a total of 131 to 82. The team played its home games at Meade Stadium in Kingston, Rhode Island.

Schedule

References

Rhode Island
Rhode Island Rams football seasons
Yankee Conference football champion seasons
Rhode Island Rams football